Hentzia elegans is a species of jumping spider found in North America. The male holotype is housed at the University of Cambridge.

References

Salticidae
Spiders of North America
Spiders described in 1885